Justicia procumbens, commonly known as water willow, (Marathi: करंबल Karambal, पित्तपापडा Pitpapada, कलमाशी Kalmashi)(Tamil:கோடகசாலை--kOdakasAlai), is a small plant native to India. Justicia procumbens is a higher altitudes plant found commonly in humid areas.

The juice of leaves is squeezed in the eyes in case of ophthalmia.

References 

procumbens
Plants described in 1753
Taxa named by Carl Linnaeus